Acacia brachyclada is a shrub belonging to the genus Acacia and the subgenus Phyllodineae.

Description
The simple inflorescences occur as single globular heads mostly containing 12 to 16 golden flowers.

Taxonomy
The species was first formally described by the botanist William Vincent Fitzgerald in 1912 as part of the work New West Australian Plants. Journal of Botany, British and Foreign. It was reclassified as Racosperma brachycladum by Leslie Pedley in 2003 before being returned to the genus Acacia'' in 2006.

Distribution
It is native to an area in the Wheatbelt, Great Southern and the  Goldfields-Esperance regions of Western Australia. It is mostly found on gentle undulating plains and low lying areas where grows in clay, loam, sandy or calcareous soils. It is usually associated with mallee scrub or woodland communities.

See also
 List of Acacia species

References

brachyclada
Acacias of Western Australia
Plants described in 1912
Taxa named by William Vincent Fitzgerald